The Usambiro barbet (Trachyphonus usambiro) is a species of bird in the African barbet family Lybiidae. It was formerly considered a subspecies of D'Arnaud's barbet, along with Emin's barbet, but was split as a distinct species by the IOC in 2021. It varies from the nominate in having a longer wing, shorter tail, darker bill. The Usambiro barbet was originally described as a subspecies of D'Arnaud's barbet in 1908 by Oscar Rudolph Neumann from a specimen collected in Usambiro in Tanzania. It is now treated as a valid species in its own right.

It is found in southern Kenya and northern Tanzania, and is found in Maasai Mara National Reserve and Serengeti National Park. The species inhabits open areas including savannah, grassland, shrubland and pastures. Where the species' range overlaps with the Red-and-yellow barbet, this species will avoid the streambeds favoured by the larger red-and-yellow barbet and occupies flat areas.

The head is yellow with black spots and the wings are black with white spots. The breast is also yellow with a dark breast band. The belly is pale yellow with a reddish vent. The sexes are similar.

The diet of this species is assumed to be the same as the D'Arnaud's barbet, comprising seeds, fruit and a wide range of insects.

References

 BirdLife International 2004.  Trachyphonus usambiro.   2006 IUCN Red List of Threatened Species.   Downloaded on 27 July 2007.

Usambiro barbet
Birds of East Africa
Usambiro barbet
Taxa named by Oscar Neumann
Taxonomy articles created by Polbot